Antai Subdistrict is a subdistrict in Gulou District, Fuzhou, Fujian province, China. , it administers the following four residential neighborhoods:
Wuyi Square Community
Wushan Community
Wuta Community
Yushan Community

See also 
 List of township-level divisions of Fujian

References 

Township-level divisions of Fujian
Fuzhou